Samuel-Alexandre Rousseau (Neuve-Maison, 11 June 1853 - Paris, 1 October 1904) was a French composer.

Life
His father made pump organs and Samuel entered the Paris Conservatoire when he was fourteen years old. He studied with Cesar Franck, and Francois Bazin

He was choirmaster at Sainte-Clotilde, Paris. He composed the comic opera, Leone.

He won the Prix de Rome in 1878, and the Legion of Honour in 1900.

Family 
He was Marcel Samuel-Rousseau's father.

References

External links 

 https://musicalics.com/en/node/95141

1853 births
1904 deaths
French Romantic composers
French opera composers
Prix de Rome for composition
Chevaliers of the Légion d'honneur